Maurice Dumas (1 May 1927 – 18 January 2015) was a member of the House of Commons of Canada from 1993 to 2000. He was a professor by career. He was born in Montreal, Quebec.

He was elected in the Argenteuil—Papineau electoral district under the Bloc Québécois party in the 1993 and 1997 general elections, serving in the 35th and 36th Canadian Parliaments respectively. Dumas retired from Canadian politics in 2000.

Electoral record (partial)

References
 

1927 births
2015 deaths
Bloc Québécois MPs
Members of the House of Commons of Canada from Quebec
Politicians from Montreal